Hillsdale is an unincorporated community and census-designated place in southeastern Laramie County, Wyoming, United States. As of the 2010 census, it had a population of 47. It lies along local roads east of the city of Cheyenne, the county seat of Laramie County. Although Hillsdale is unincorporated, it has a post office, with the ZIP code of 82060. Public education in the community of Hillsdale is provided by Laramie County School District #2.

Hillsdale was named for Lathrop Hills, a Surveyor for the Union Pacific Railroad who was killed nearby along Lodgepole Creek on June 11, 1867, while leading a party surveying a route of the Transcontinental Railroad.

Hillsdale was platted as a townsite in April 2013.

Notable person
Kenny Sailors, American college and professional basketball player active in the 1940s and early 1950s notable for popularizing the jump shot as an alternative to the two-handed, flat-footed set shot.

References

Unincorporated communities in Laramie County, Wyoming
Unincorporated communities in Wyoming
Census-designated places in Laramie County, Wyoming
Census-designated places in Wyoming